"Be My Lover" is a song recorded by German Eurodance group La Bouche and released in March 1995 as the second single from their debut album, Sweet Dreams (1995). The song was written by group members Melanie Thornton and Lane McCray with Uli Brenner and Gerd Amir Saraf, who co-produced it with Frank Farian. It remains their most successful song, alongside "Sweet Dreams", and was a worldwide hit. In Europe, it was a number-one hit in the Czech Republic, Germany, Hungary, Romania, and Sweden, as well as on the Eurochart Hot 100. In the US, the single reached number five on the Cash Box Top 100, number six on the Billboard Hot 100 and also topped the Billboard Hot Dance Club Play chart for two weeks in December 1995. To date, it has sold six million copies worldwide. La Bouche won the 1996 Echo award in Germany in the category for Best Dance Single with "Be My Lover", and the ASCAP award in the US for the 'Most Played Song in America'. It was dubbed into many megamix tracks and has had several remix versions.

In 2000, when Melanie Thornton left the group to start with her solo career, La Bouche released a new version of "Be My Lover" with vocals by Natascha Wright, who replaced Thornton as the female singer of the group.

Background
American rapper Lane McCray met American singer Melanie Thornton in Saarbrücken, Germany while he was on active duty in the US Air Force. Thornton had moved from the US to Germany, where she performed as guest vocalist on dance-pop recordings.

They went together in a band called Groovin' Affairs and were discovered by German record producer Frank Farian, the mastermind and voice behind the duo Milli Vanilli and prior Boney M. Then they founded the Eurodance duo La Bouche. McCray and Thornton wrote "Be My Lover" together and started recording in the spring of 1994. Because of McCray's duty in the US Air Force, La Bouche's success faced one minor challenge. But the duo went on becoming one of the most popular Eurodance acts of the mid-90s.

Composition
La Bouche's Melanie Thornton and Lane McCray co-wrote the song with Uli Brenner and Gerd Amir Saraf. It is written in the key of C minor and follows a tempo of 134 beats per minute. "Be My Lover" follows a basic chord progression of Cm–A–B, and the vocals span from G3 to F5.

Chart performance
"Be My Lover" topped both the US Billboard Hot Dance Club Play chart and the Canadian RPM Dance/Urban chart, and reached the top 10 of the US Cash Box Top 100 and the US Billboard'''s Hot 100. It also peaked at number-one in Germany, Hungary, the Czech Republic, Mexico, Romania, and Sweden. On the Eurochart Hot 100, the single reached number-one on May 27, 1995. Additionally, it peaked at the number two position in Australia, Iceland, Italy, the Netherlands and Norway. "Be My Lover" was a top 10 hit in at least 16 countries, like Belgium (6), Brazil, Denmark (9), France (7), Greece, Ireland (8), Spain (6), and Switzerland (5). In the United Kingdom, it peaked at number 25 on the UK Singles Chart on February 25, 1996, while reaching number 20 on the UK Dance Chart. The single also reached number two on the UK on a Pop Tip Club Chart by Music Week.

"Be My Lover" has sold six million copies worldwide to date. It earned a gold record in Austria (25,000), France (250,000), Germany (250,000), Norway and the US (500,000), a silver record in the UK (200,000), and a platinum record in Australia (70,000). La Bouche won the 1996 Echo award in Germany for Best Dance Single with "Be My Lover", and the ASCAP award in the US for the "Most Played Song in America". The song was also nominated for Best Dance Video at the 1996 MTV Video Music Awards while La Bouche was nominated in the category for Best Dance at the 1995 MTV Europe Music Awards.

Critical reception
An editor from The Atlanta Journal-Constitution declared the song as a "high-energy hit". J.D. Considine from The Baltimore Sun described it as "searing". Larry Flick from Billboard viewed it as "tirelessly giddy". Michael Saunders from Boston Globe praised it as a "glorious" and "twinkly" cut. Gil L. Robertson IV from Cash Box named "Be My Lover" a "standout track" from Sweet Dreams. Beth D'Addono from Delaware County Daily Times commented, "La da da dee da da da dah... Then that infectious disco beat kicks in, and "Be My Lover" blares from the car radio, takes over the dance floor, reverberates through the health club, inspiring step classes to even greater heights." Lynn Dean Ford from Indianapolis Star compared the song to Snap! and Real McCoy, with "their relentless energy steeped in tension and computerization." 

Connie Johnson from Los Angeles Times wrote, "Sounding like a black ABBA crossed with the C+C Music Factory, Melanie Thornton and Lane McCray invest attitude into such tracks as “Be My Lover”, but you’d have to be a die-hard Euro-dance fan to appreciate it." Chuck Campbell from Knoxville News Sentinel commented, "How does La Bouche's Top 10 hit "Be My Lover" distinguish itself from the scores of other similar dance songs to be Flavor of the Month? It must be the opening la-da-da-di-da-da-da-da of vocalist Melanie Thornton (who then goes on a spree of la's, da's and di's). Otherwise it's an ordinary, albeit invigorating, dance track." In his weekly UK chart commentary, James Masterton stated that it "could well turn out to be one of the pop smashes of the year. Right from the 'La Da Da De Dah' introduction and hook this is one Euro-hit that has 'floor-filler' written all over it. Top 10 within a fortnight, just watch." 

A reviewer from Music Week gave it three out of five, adding further that "this fairly standard piece of Europop is unlikely to top labelmates Real McCoy in the UK." An editor, Alan Jones, remarked its "accomplished diva vocals" and "acute commercial nature". Jim Farber from New York Daily News deemed it as a "Euro-disco plea", that "sounds so freakishly retro." People Magazine wrote that the song "underscore buoyant vocals with dark minor-key arrangements". Richmond Times-Dispatchs reviewer said, "I am insanely jealous of the lead female vocal, Melanie Thornton. She has a wonderful, flexible voice." The Tampa Tribune stated that her vocals "are a little better than those of the average disco songstress." James Hamilton from the RM Dance Update described it as a "infectiously 'la de dah'-ed German smash by a Frankfurt based US duo in the usual Euro style".

Music video
Two different music videos were made for this song, a European version and an American version.

The European version was filmed at the beginning of 1995, in the city at night. Melanie Thornton appears as a dominatrix wearing a black outfit. She is driving a van, abducting McCray to an underground club, where several men are being held captive. They are hanging upside down from hooks in the ceiling. Thornton walks around these men while she sings. Suddenly McCray manages to break free and raps toward Thornton. An edited version doesn't show McCray being captured and almost all the scenes with the men being hanging upside down were cut. The uncensored music video was later published on La Bouche's official YouTube channel in February 2016, and had generated more than 108 million views as of January 2023.

The American version was filmed in a studio, at the beginning of 1996 with Thornton singing into a microphone and wearing a purple dress. It was directed by Andras Mahr. This version was later published on YouTube in February 2014.

Retrospective response
American entertainment company BuzzFeed ranked "Be My Lover" number six in their list of "The 101 Greatest Dance Songs of the '90s" in 2017. Matt Stopera and Brian Galindo stated that "when you think of a '90s dance artist or group, La Bouche is on that list. A legend." In 2015, it was ranked one of "The 50 Best Pop Singles of 1995" by Idolator. Bianca Gracie declared it as a "blood-pumping" tune "that combined energetic waves of synths with incredibly soulful vocals that kept bodies moving way longer than those endless rounds of Sex On The Beach cocktails ever could!". She added that "Be My Lover" "still provides a sense of euphoric escape that continues to refuel the spirit." James Arena, the writer of Stars of '90s Dance Pop: 29 Hitmakers Discuss Their Careers called the song "blistering", adding that it, with "Sweet Dreams", "are widely regarded today as indispensable classics of the decade." Vibe included "Be My Lover" in their list of "30 Dance Tracks From The '90s That Changed The Game" in 2013.

Accolades

Track listings
These are the formats and track listings of major single releases of "Be My Lover".

 12" maxi – Europe "Be My Lover" (Club Mix) – 5:28
 "Be My Lover" (House Mix) – 4:26
 "Be My Lover" (Trance Mix) – 6:35
 "Be My Lover" (Radio Edit) – 3:59

 12" maxi – US, UK, Ireland "Be My Lover" (Spike Club Mix) – 8:54
 "Be My Lover" (Club Mix) – 6:26
 "Be My Lover" (Spike Dub) – 8:21
 "Be My Lover" (Hi-NRG Mix) – 5:46

 CD single / cassette "Be My Lover" (Radio Edit) – 3:58
 "Be My Lover" (Trance Mix) – 6:35 (Germany only)
 "Be My Lover" (House Mix) – 4:49 (France only)
 "Be My Lover" (Radio Edit No Rap) – 3:50 (US only)

 CD maxi 1 "Be My Lover" (Radio Edit) – 3:58
 "Be My Lover" (Club Mix 135 BPM) – 5:28
 "Be My Lover" (Trance Mix 150 BPM) – 6:35
 "Do You Still Need Me" – 3:35

 CD maxi – US "Be My Lover" (Club Mix) – 6:26
 "Be My Lover" (Spike Club Mix) – 8:54
 "Be My Lover" (Hi-NRG Mix) – 5:46
 "Be My Lover" (Alex Goes to Cleveland Mix) – 5:06
 "Be My Lover" (Doug Laurent Classic Mix Edit) – 4:07

 CD maxi – Remixes' "Be My Lover" (Euro Dance Mix) – 6:12
 "Be My Lover" (Hi-NRG Mix) – 5:47
 "Be My Lover" (Serious Groove Dub Mix) – 5:41
 "Be My Lover" (Alex Goes to Cleveland Mix) – 5:05
 "Be My Lover" (Doug Laurent Classic Mix – Edit) – 4:10
 "Be My Lover" (Trance Mix) – 7:12
 "Be My Lover" (House Mix) – 4:51

Charts

Weekly charts

Year-end charts

Certifications

Usage in media
The song was played in the 1995 Brazilian soap opera A Próxima Vítima, in an episode of the American TV series Beverly Hills 90210 in 1996, in the 1997 movie Romy and Michele's High School Reunion, in the 1998 movie A Night at the Roxbury, in the 1999 movie Earthly Possessions, and in an episode of the sitcom Step by Step. It was also spoofed as "One Zero 001" on a computer-themed episode of Bill Nye the Science Guy and used in Audition Online Dance Battle as a song. It can be vaguely heard in the background in the "World's Greatest Dick" episode of 3rd Rock from the Sun, in the gay bar that Sally and Harry walk into at the beginning of the episode. It was played during the second episode of The Assassination of Gianni Versace: American Crime Story, as Gianni (played by Édgar Ramírez) and his boyfriend Antonio (played by Ricky Martin) enter a gay bar.

Cover versions, samples and remixes
 The song was covered by Hysterie in 2003.
 Romanian dance pop singer Inna sampled the song for her third studio album Party Never Ends and released it as an official single in 2013.
 Dutch DJ and producer Sam Feldt made a cover of this track with Alex Schulz in 2017.
 Akina Nakamori covered the song in her 2017 cover album Cage''.
 In 2018, Austrian Rapper Raf Camora & German Rapper Bonez MC have used a sample of the song for their Hit single “Kokain.”
 Additionally in 2018, two Norwich City footballers (Onel Hernandez and Tom Trybull) were recorded dancing to the song after a win.
 In 2019, Italian artist Achille Lauro sampled the song for his hit single "1990"

References

External links

1995 singles
1995 songs
La Bouche songs
Electro songs
House music songs
Techno songs
Number-one singles in Australia
Number-one singles in the Czech Republic
Number-one singles in Germany
Number-one singles in Hungary
Number-one singles in Mexico
Number-one singles in Norway
Number-one singles in Romania
Number-one singles in Sweden
Song recordings produced by Frank Farian
Songs written by Melanie Thornton
Arista Records singles
RCA Records singles
English-language German songs